Albert Duffel (February 7, 1813 – September 22, 1862) was a justice of the Louisiana Supreme Court from March 12, 1860, to April, 1862.

Born in Ascension Parish, Louisiana, Duffel gained admission to the bar in 1836.

References

1813 births
1862 deaths
People from Ascension Parish, Louisiana
Justices of the Louisiana Supreme Court
19th-century American judges